In Greek mythology, Deidamia (/ˌdeɪdəˈmaɪə/; Greek: Δηϊδάμεια, Deidameia) was the name referring to the following women:

 Deidamia, a Messenian princess as the daughter of King Perieres and the mother of Iphiclus, Althaea and Leda by King Thestius of Pleuron.
Deidamia of Scyros, a princess and daughter of King Lycomedes. She was the lover of Achilles and by him the mother of Neoptolemus.
 Deidamia, a Lycian princess as the daughter of the hero Bellerophon and Philonoe, daughter of the Lycian king, Iobates. She married King Evander of Lycia, son of the elder Sarpedon (son of Zeus and Europa), and had by him a son, the younger Sarpedon, who was identified with the Sarpedon that fought at Troy. Under the name of Hippodamia or Laodamia she also said to coupled with either Zeus or Xanthus to bore Sarpedon.
 Deidamia, other name of Hippodamia, the bride of Pirithous who was abducted by the Centaurs.

Notes

References 

 Apollodorus, The Library with an English Translation by Sir James George Frazer, F.B.A., F.R.S. in 2 Volumes, Cambridge, MA, Harvard University Press; London, William Heinemann Ltd. 1921. ISBN 0-674-99135-4. Online version at the Perseus Digital Library. Greek text available from the same website.
 Dictys Cretensis, from The Trojan War. The Chronicles of Dictys of Crete and Dares the Phrygian translated by Richard McIlwaine Frazer, Jr. (1931-). Indiana University Press. 1966. Online version at the Topos Text Project.
 Diodorus Siculus, The Library of History translated by Charles Henry Oldfather. Twelve volumes. Loeb Classical Library. Cambridge, Massachusetts: Harvard University Press; London: William Heinemann, Ltd. 1989. Vol. 3. Books 4.59–8. Online version at Bill Thayer's Web Site
 Diodorus Siculus, Bibliotheca Historica. Vol 1-2. Immanel Bekker. Ludwig Dindorf. Friedrich Vogel. in aedibus B. G. Teubneri. Leipzig. 1888-1890. Greek text available at the Perseus Digital Library.
 Homer, The Iliad with an English Translation by A.T. Murray, Ph.D. in two volumes. Cambridge, MA., Harvard University Press; London, William Heinemann, Ltd. 1924. . Online version at the Perseus Digital Library.
 Homer, Homeri Opera in five volumes. Oxford, Oxford University Press. 1920. . Greek text available at the Perseus Digital Library.
 Lucius Mestrius Plutarchus, Lives with an English Translation by Bernadotte Perrin. Cambridge, MA. Harvard University Press. London. William Heinemann Ltd. 1914. 1. Online version at the Perseus Digital Library. Greek text available from the same website.
 Pseudo-Clement, Recognitions from Ante-Nicene Library Volume 8, translated by Smith, Rev. Thomas. T. & T. Clark, Edinburgh. 1867. Online version at theio.com

Princesses in Greek mythology
Lycians
Lycia